Matador Mountain is a prominent, ice-free mountain,  high, standing at the south side of the mouth of Gallup Glacier, Antarctica, where the latter enters Shackleton Glacier. It was named by F. Alton Wade, leader of the Texas Tech Shackleton Glacier Expedition (1962–63), as "Matador" is a former name of Texas Tech University's (formerly Texas Technological College) athletic teams, and all three members of the party were affiliated with the college.

References

Mountains of the Ross Dependency
Dufek Coast